The Colorado Springs Sky Sox were a Minor League Baseball team in Colorado Springs, Colorado, from 1950 to 1958. The team played in the Class A Western League as a farm team for the Chicago White Sox. 

The Sky Sox, named for their association with the White Sox, won the league pennant in 1953, 1955, and 1958. 

When the Western League folded at the end of the 1958 season, the club also ceased operations. The Pikes Peak region was without professional baseball for 30 years until 1988, when the Hawaii Islanders of the Pacific Coast League relocated to Colorado Springs and became the second incarnation of the Sky Sox; they moved after 2018 to become the Triple-A San Antonio Missions.

References

Chicago White Sox minor league affiliates
Defunct baseball teams in Colorado
Defunct minor league baseball teams
Professional baseball teams in Colorado
Baseball teams established in 1950
Baseball teams disestablished in 1958
Sports in Colorado Springs, Colorado
1950 establishments in Colorado
1958 disestablishments in Colorado
Defunct Western League teams